Eva Lauermanová (born 14 March 1931) is a Czech cross-country skier. She competed in the women's 10 km and the women's 3 × 5 km relay events at the 1956 Winter Olympics.

Cross-country skiing results

Olympic Games

World Championships

References

External links
 

1931 births
Possibly living people
Czech female cross-country skiers
Olympic cross-country skiers of Czechoslovakia
Cross-country skiers at the 1956 Winter Olympics
Sportspeople from Prague